Alistair John MacKenzie Duff (born 1954) is a former Scottish advocate and sheriff who later became Director of the Judicial Institute of Scotland before resigning after being arrested and charged with undisclosed offences.

Personal life
Duff was born in Kirkcaldy, Fife in 1954 and moved to Glenrothes where he attended secondary school at Glenwood High School, Glenrothes then to Glenrothes High School where both his father and uncle were teachers. In 1971 he went to Edinburgh Law School where he graduated with first class honours. He married Carol Ferguson in April 1978 in Edinburgh, with whom he had five children. They divorced in 2007 and in the same year he married his current wife Susan Duff.

Susan Duff was a defence advocate at Compass Chambers in Edinburgh, subsequently appointed a Sheriff in October 2021 for Tayside, Central and Fife regions.

Legal career
 Alistair Duff was admitted as a solicitor in 1977 and worked as a procurator fiscal between 1977 and 1981
 He was in private practice as a solicitor specialising in criminal defence between 1981 and 2004
 He qualified as a solicitor-advocate with criminal rights of audience in 1993 and conducted cases before the High Court of Justiciary
 He was engaged to advise the two Libyan nationals accused in the Lockerbie case in 1993 and subsequently represented  Abdelbaset al-Megrahi at the Pan Am Flight 103 bombing trial in the Netherlands between 1999 and 2002
 He was appointed Resident Sheriff in the Sheriff Court of Dundee in 2004
 In 2007 he was appointed to the Scottish Prisons Commission alongside Henry McLeish, Lesley Riddoch, Dr Karin Dotter-Schiller, Geraldine Gammell, Richard Jeffrey and Chief Constable David Strang
 He became involved in judicial training in 2011 and was appointed Director of the Judicial Institute for Scotland in 2014. The Institute provides education and training for Scottish judges in all aspects of Scots Law. In his role of Director he attended many high level conferences concerning judicial reform in Scotland and Europe.
 In 2016 he gave a presentation to National Youth Justice Conference organised by the Children and Young Peoples Centre for Justice
 In 2019 he was appointed to a tribunal alongside Lord Bracadale and others to look into the case of Aberdeen Sheriff Jack Brown concerning alleged sexual misconduct, the tribunal's findings were later overturned.
 He has formerly been a member of the following bodies: -
 Law Society of Scotland Council 
 Scottish Sentencing Council 
 McInnes Committee on Summary Justice Reform 
In December 2021 he abruptly retired from the Judicial Institute for Scotland following his arrest in October 2021.

Arrest
He was arrested and charged in December 2021 following a complaint made in October 2021 and was due to appear in court, though as of March 2023 this is yet to happen, and the nature of the charges have not been revealed.

Concerns about the apparent secrecy surrounding the case were expressed in various quarters, including Member of Scottish Parliament Russell Findlay who submitted two written questions to the Scottish Parliament asking for the publication of ministerial correspondence relating to Duff's arrest and resignation  and legal advice received in ruling against the MSP, all of which were rejected.

In November 2022 following further police investigations, Duff was arrested and charged with a further offence.

References 

Scottish lawyers
1954 births
Living people